Peter Newman is an English author of fantasy novels and short stories, including the Gemmell Award-winning The Vagrant. He is also co-writer of the Hugo Award winning Tea and Jeopardy podcast.

Personal life 
Newman lives in Somerset with his wife, fellow author Emma Newman, and son. Growing up in and around London, he studied Drama and Education at the Central School of Speech and Drama, going on to work as a secondary school drama teacher.

Writing career

The Vagrant Trilogy 

 The Vagrant (winner of the Morningstar Award for best debut novel at the David Gemmell Awards 2016)
 The Malice
 The Seven

The Deathless Trilogy 

 The Deathless
 The Ruthless
 The Boundless

Short Stories 

 The Vagrant and the City
 The Hammer and the Goat

References

Living people
British fantasy writers
Year of birth missing (living people)
English male novelists